The Heywood Hill Literary Prize was awarded yearly to a writer, editor, reviewer, collector or publisher for a lifelong contribution to the enjoyment of books. Andrew Cavendish, 11th Duke of Devonshire sponsored the award, which included a prize worth £15,000, until his death in 2004. Since then, the prize has not been awarded.

References 

English literary awards